LANKAQR, developed by Central Bank of Sri Lanka is an integrated payment system in Sri Lanka. Establishment of a National Quick Response Code Standard for Local Currency Payments was launched on 11 March 2019 and all Financial Institutions (Licensed Banks and Licensed Finance Companies), and Licensed Operators of Mobile Phone Based e-Money Systems who offer QR Code based payment solutions. Currently, LANKAQR is supported on Android and iOS devices.

Overview 
LANKAQR is a game-changing initiative that aims to digitize the payment system in Sri Lanka, making it faster, easier, and more secure for business entrepreneurs, especially small and medium-sized enterprises (SMEs). This common Quick Response Code standard has been introduced by financial institutions in the country to offer a more convenient way of accepting digital payments.

For merchants, the process of setting up LANKAQR is quick and easy. All they need to do is display the LANKAQR stickers, which are provided for free by the member organizations of LANKAQR, at their place of business. Customers can then make payments by scanning the LANKAQR code using their mobile payment application, which is provided by their financial institution. The payment is credited instantly to the merchant's account, and the merchant will receive an SMS confirmation. This eliminates the need for manual data entry, reducing the chances of errors and increasing the speed and efficiency of the payment process.

For customers, LANKAQR offers a fast and secure way to make payments. All they need is a mobile phone and a bank account, and they can make payments directly from their bank account to the merchant's account. The mobile payment application is easy to use and offers a fast and secure way to make payments. There is no need to carry cash or worry about losing receipts, and the customer's bank account is always in control.

In conclusion, LANKAQR is a valuable solution for both merchants and customers in Sri Lanka. It offers a fast, easy, and secure way to make digital payments, making it an ideal solution for business entrepreneurs, especially SMEs, who are looking for a more convenient way to accept payments. With LANKAQR, the financial industry in Sri Lanka is taking a big step forward in the digitization of its payment system, offering a more convenient and efficient way for businesses to receive and make payments.

References 

2019 establishments in Sri Lanka
Electronic funds transfer
Financial services in Sri Lanka